Stade Pierre Brisson is a multi-use stadium in Beauvais, France.  It is used mostly for football matches and serves as the home stadium for AS Beauvais Oise. The stadium is able to hold 10,178 spectators.

External links
World Stadiums entry

Pierre Brisson
AS Beauvais Oise
Sports venues in Oise